Versus the World may refer to:
Versus the World (Amon Amarth album), 2002
Versus the World (band), an alternative rock band
Versus the World (Versus the World album), 2005